Johannes Frey may refer to:
 Johannes Frey (bishop)
 Johannes Frey (judoka)